Don't be the First One!, also known as Number 1, is a South Korean television entertainment program distributed by JTBC.

Synopsis
According to a research in 2019, 11,800 couples divorced in South Korea, but none came from comedian couples. This reality show analyses what maintained the comedian couples' marriages.

Format
The show is filmed with hidden cameras set up in each of the celebrities' actual home. In each episode, as the show moves from one family to the next, a brief analysis by the starring guests is given to in between segment of the episode.

Presenters

Hosts
Park Mi-sun Ep. 1 – present
Jang Do-yeon Ep. 1 – present

Current cast
 –  Ep. 1 – present
 –  Ep. 1 – present	
Park Joon-hyung –  Ep. 1 – present	
 –  Ep. 17 – present
 –  Ep. 20 – present
 –  Ep. 25 – present

Ratings 
In the ratings below, the highest rating for the show will be in red, and the lowest rating for the show will be in blue each year.

List of ratings in 2020 (episode 1- )

References

External links
  
 Don't be the First One! JTBC Worldwide
Don't be the First One!-DAUM
Don't be the First One!-NAVER

2020 South Korean television series debuts
Korean-language television shows
JTBC original programming
South Korean variety television shows
2021 South Korean television series endings